Simran Choudhary is an Indian actress and model who works in Telugu films. She won the title of Femina Miss India Telangana 2017. Simran made her film debut in 2014 with the Telugu film Hum Tum.

Early life 
Simran was born and brought up in Hyderabad. She has done her schooling from DRS international School and completed her graduation from St. Francis College for Women, Hyderabad.

Career
Simran Choudhary started her career as a model and participated in many contests, and she won the titles of Tollywood Miss Hyderabad, in 2017 Femina Miss India Telangana, Miss Talented. She began her acting career in the year 2014 in Telugu film Hum Tum.

Filmography

References

External links

Actresses in Telugu cinema
21st-century Indian actresses
Telugu actresses
Living people
Indian film actresses
1996 births